Deeper is the eighth studio album by British singer Lisa Stansfield, released on 6 April 2018. All songs were written or co-written by Stansfield and produced by her husband Ian Devaney and Snowboy.

"Everything" was made available to download from 8 January 2018 from pre-ordering the album, and the first official single, "Billionaire", was released on 26 February 2018. The second single, "Never Ever", followed in April 2018, reaching number 6 on the US Billboard Dance Club Songs chart. Stansfield embarked on a UK and European tour in April and May 2018 to promote the album. The deluxe edition of Deeper was released on 26 October 2018, including a bonus CD with four new live recordings from Stansfield's recent tour, remixes of "Billionaire", "Deeper" and "Never Ever", as well as a new version of "There Goes My Heart".

Track listing
All songs produced by Ian Devaney and Snowboy.

Charts

Release history

References

External links

Official website
Official Fan website

2018 albums
Lisa Stansfield albums